Lycodon carianatus is a snake of the Colubridae family. It is endemic to the island of Sri Lanka. The snake is commonly known as the Sri Lankan Wolf Snake, and as දාර කරවලා (Daara Karawala) or දාර රදනකයා  (daara radanakayaa) in Sinhala.

Description
Dorsal side black with 19 distinct white rings. These may be reduced or completely absent in adults. Black bands extend to venter, but are fairly diffuse. Scales are keeled and dull in appearance. Midbody scale rows 17-19. Ventrals 180-202. Subcaudals entire 42-64.

Ecology
Nocturnal and terrestrial, hiding under rubble in forests during the day. Diet comprises frogs, geckos, skinks and small non-venomous snakes.

Reproduction
Lycodon carinatus is oviparous, laying 4 to 7 eggs at a time.

Taxonomy Updates
This species has been shifted to the genus Lycodon in 2013 (PYRON et al. 2013) from previously known genus Cercaspis

References
 http://animaldiversity.ummz.umich.edu/accounts/Cercaspis/classification/
 http://reptile-database.reptarium.cz/species?genus=Lycodon&species=carinatus
 https://www.inaturalist.org/taxa/27353-Cercaspis-carinatus
 http://eol.org/pages/795452/names/synonyms
 http://reptile-database.reptarium.cz/species?genus=Lycodon&species=carinatus

Reptiles of Sri Lanka
carinatus
Taxa named by Heinrich Kuhl
Reptiles described in 1820